In anthropology, pygmy peoples are ethnic groups whose average height is unusually short.

The term is primarily associated with the African Pygmies, the hunter-gatherers of the Congo Basin (comprising the Bambenga, Bambuti and Batwa).

The terms "Asiatic Pygmies" and "Oceanian pygmies" have been used to describe the Negrito populations of Southeast Asia and Australo-Melanesian peoples of short stature. The Taron people of Myanmar are an exceptional case of a "pygmy" population of East Asian phenotype.

Etymology 

The term pygmy, as used to refer to diminutive people, derives from Greek πυγμαῖος pygmaios via Latin Pygmaei (sing. Pygmaeus), derived from πυγμή – meaning a short forearm cubit, or a measure of length corresponding to the distance from the wrist to the elbow or knuckles. (See also Greek πῆχυς pēkhys.) In Greek mythology the word describes a tribe of dwarfs, first described by Homer, the ancient Greek poet, and reputed to live in India and south of modern-day Ethiopia.

The term pygmy is sometimes considered pejorative. However, there is no single term to replace it. In French speaking Africa, they are sometimes referred to as autochthon, (autochtone), referring to 'native' or 'indigenous'. Many prefer to be identified by their ethnicity, such as the Aka (Mbenga), Baka, Mbuti, and Twa. The term Bayaka, the plural form of the Aka/Yaka, is sometimes used in the Central African Republic to refer to all local pygmies. Likewise, the Kongo word Bambenga is used in Congo. In parts of Africa they are called Wochua or Achua.

Short stature 

Various theories have been proposed to explain the short stature of pygmies. Some studies suggest that it could be related to adaptation to low ultraviolet light levels in rainforests. This might mean that relatively little vitamin D can be made in human skin, thereby limiting calcium uptake from the diet for bone growth and maintenance and leading to the evolution of the small skeletal size.

Other explanations include lack of food in the rainforest environment, low calcium levels in the soil, the need to move through dense jungle, adaptation to heat and humidity, and as an association with rapid reproductive maturation under conditions of early mortality. Other evidence points towards unusually low levels of expression of the genes encoding the growth hormone receptor and growth hormone compared to the related tribal groups, associated with low serum levels of insulin-like growth factor 1 and short stature.

Africa 

African Pygmies live in several ethnic groups in Rwanda, Burundi, Uganda, Democratic Republic of the Congo, Republic of the Congo (ROC), Central African Republic, Cameroon, Equatorial Guinea, Gabon, Angola, Botswana, Namibia, Madagascar, and Zambia. There are at least a dozen pygmy groups, sometimes unrelated to each other. The best known are the Mbenga (Aka and Baka) of the western Congo basin, who speak Bantu and Ubangian languages; the Mbuti (Efe etc.) of the Ituri Rainforest, who speak Bantu and Central Sudanic languages, and the Twa of the African Great Lakes, who speak Bantu Rundi and Kiga. Most pygmy communities are partially hunter-gatherers, living partially but not exclusively on the wild products of their environment. They trade with neighbouring farmers to acquire cultivated foods and other material items; no group lives deep in the forest without access to agricultural products. It is estimated that there are between 250,000 and 600,000 Pygmies living in the Congo rainforest. However, although Pygmies are thought of as forest people, the groups called Twa may live in open swamp or desert.

Origins 
Expansion to Central Africa by the ancestors of African Pygmies most likely took place before 130,000 years ago, and certainly before 60,000 years ago. A commonly held belief is that African Pygmies are the direct descendants of Late Stone Age hunter-gatherer peoples of the central African rainforest, who were partially absorbed or displaced by later immigration of agricultural peoples, and adopted their Central Sudanic, Ubangian, and Bantu languages. This view has no archaeological support and ambiguous support from genetics and linguistics. 

Some 30% of Aka language is not Bantu, and a similar percentage of Baka language is not Ubangian. Much of pygmy vocabulary is botanical, dealing with honey collecting, or is otherwise specialized for the forest and is shared between the two western pygmy groups. It has been proposed that this is the remnant of an independent western pygmy (Mbenga or "Baaka") language. However, this type of vocabulary is subject to widespread borrowing among the Pygmies and neighboring peoples, and the "Baaka" language was only reconstructed to the 15th century.

African Pygmy populations are genetically diverse and extremely divergent from all other human populations, suggesting they have an ancient indigenous lineage. Their uniparental markers represent the second-most ancient divergence, after those typically found in Khoisan peoples. Recent advances in genetics shed some light on the origins of the various Pygmy groups. Researchers found "an early divergence of the ancestors of Pygmy hunter–gatherers and farming populations 60,000 years ago, followed by a split of the Pygmies' ancestors into the Western and Eastern pygmy groups 20,000 years ago."

New evidence suggests East and West African Pygmy children have different growth patterns. The difference between the two groups may indicate the Pygmies’ short stature did not start with their common ancestor but instead evolved independently in adapting to similar environments, which adds support that some sets of genes related to height were advantageous in Eastern Pygmy populations, but not in Western Pygmy populations.

However, Roger Blench argues that the Pygmies are not descended from residual hunter-gatherer groups but rather are offshoots of larger neighboring ethnolinguistic groups that had adopted forest subsistence strategies. Blench notes the lack of clear linguistic and archaeological evidence for the antiquity of pygmy cultures and peoples and also notes that the genetic evidence can be problematic. Blench also notes that there is no evidence of the Pygmies have hunting technology distinctive from that of their neighbors, and argues that the short stature of pygmy populations can arise relatively quickly (in less than a few millennia) due to strong selection pressures.

Culture 

The African Pygmies are particularly known for their usually vocal music, usually characterised by dense contrapuntal communal improvisation. Simha Arom says that the level of polyphonic complexity of pygmy music was reached in Europe in the 14th century, yet Pygmy culture is unwritten and ancient. Music permeates daily life and there are songs for entertainment as well as specific events and activities.

Violence against Pygmies

Reported genocides 

The pygmy population was a target of the Interahamwe during the 1994 Rwandan genocide. Of the 30,000 Pygmies in Rwanda, an estimated 10,000 were killed and another 10,000 were displaced. They have been described as "forgotten victims" of the genocide.

From the end of 2002 through January 2003 around 60,000 Pygmy civilians and 10,000 combatants were killed and often cannibalized in an extermination campaign known as "Effacer le tableau" during the Second Congo War. Human rights activists have made demands for the massacre to be recognized as genocide.

Forced removal 

In a strategy referred to as fortress conservation, in national parks in the Democratic Republic of the Congo, such as Kahuzi-Biéga National Park; Messok Dja protected area in the Republic of the Congo; and Cameroon's Lobéké National Park, heavily armed park rangers come into deadly conflict with the Pygmy inhabitants who often cut the trees down to sell charcoal. The conservation efforts of national parks in the country are often financed by international organizations such as the World Wildlife Fund and often involve removing native inhabitants off the land. Some have argued that the most efficient conservation methods involve giving land rights to the land's indigenous inhabitants.

Reported slavery 
In the Republic of the Congo, where Pygmies make up 2% of the population, many Pygmies live as slaves to Bantu masters. The nation is deeply stratified between these two major ethnic groups. The Pygmy slaves belong to their Bantu masters from birth in a relationship that the Bantus call a time-honored tradition. A 2007 news report stated that even though Pygmies are responsible for much of the hunting, fishing and manual labor in jungle villages, "Pygmies and Bantus alike say that Pygmies are often paid at the master's whim: in cigarettes, used clothing, or even nothing at all." As a result of pressure from UNICEF and human-rights activists, in 2009, a law that would grant special protections to the Pygmy people was awaiting a vote by the Congo parliament. According to reports made in 2013, this law was never passed.

In the Democratic Republic of the Congo, during the Ituri conflict, Ugandan-backed rebel groups were accused by the UN of enslaving Mbutis to prospect for minerals and forage for forest food, with those returning empty handed being killed and eaten.

Ethnic conflict 

In Northern Katanga Province starting in 2013, the Pygmy Batwa people, whom the Luba people often exploit and allegedly enslave, rose up into militias, such as the "Perci" militia, and attacked Luba villages. A Luba militia known as "Elements" counterattacked. More than a thousand people were killed in the first eight months of 2014 alone with the number of displaced people estimated to be 650,000 as of December 2017. The weapons used in the conflict are often arrows and axes, rather than guns.

Discrimination 

Historically, the pygmy have always been viewed as inferior by both colonial authorities and the village-dwelling Bantu tribes. Pygmy children were sometimes captured during the period of the Congo Free State, which exported Pygmy children to zoos throughout Europe, including the world's fair in the United States in 1907. Pygmies are often evicted from their land and given the lowest paying jobs. At a state level, Pygmies are sometimes not considered citizens and are refused identity cards, deeds to land, health care and proper schooling. The Lancet published a review showing that Pygmy populations often had worse access to health care than neighboring communities.

Asia and Pacific

Southeast Asia 

Negritos in Southeast Asia (including the Batak and Aeta of the Philippines, the Andamanese of the Andaman Islands, and the Semang of the Malay Peninsula) are sometimes called pygmies (especially in older literature). Negritos share some common physical features with African pygmy populations, including short stature and dark skin. The name "Negrito", from the Spanish adjective meaning "small black person", was given by early explorers. The explorers who named the Negritos assumed the Andamanese they encountered were from Africa. This belief was, however, discarded by anthropologists who noted that apart from dark skin, peppercorn hair, and steatopygia, the Andamanese had little in common with any African population, including the African pygmies. Their superficial resemblance to some Africans and Melanesians is thought to be from living in a similar environment, or simply retentions of the initial human form.

Their origin and the route of their migration to Asia is a matter of great speculation. They are genetically distant from Africans and have been shown to have separated early from Asians, suggesting that they are either surviving descendants of settlers from the early out-of-Africa migration of the Great Coastal Migration of the Proto-Australoids, or that they are descendants of one of the founder populations of modern humans.

Frank Kingdon-Ward in the early 20th century reported a tribe of pygmy Tibeto-Burman speakers known as the Taron inhabiting the remote region of Mt. Hkakabo Razi in Southeast Asia on the border of China (Yunnan and Tibet), Burma, and India. A Burmese survey done in the 1960s reported a mean height of an adult male Taron at 1.43 m (4'6") and that of females at 1.40 m (4'5"). These are the only known "pygmies" of clearly East Asian descent.

The cause of their diminutive size is unknown, but diet and endogamous marriage practices have been cited. The population of Taron pygmies has been steadily shrinking and is now down to only a few individuals. In 2013, a link between the Taron and the Derung people in Yunnan, China, was uncovered by Richard D. Fisher, which may indicate the presence of pygmy populations among the Derung tribe.

Disputed pygmy presence in Australia 
Australian anthropologist Norman Tindale and American anthropologist Joseph Birdsell suggested there were 12 Negrito-like tribes of short-statured Aboriginal peoples living on the coastal and rainforest areas around Cairns on the lands of the Mbabaram people and Djabugay people. Birdsell found that the average adult male height of Aboriginal people in this region was significantly less than that of other Aboriginal Australian groups; however, it was still greater than the maximum height for classification as a pygmy people, so the term pygmy may be considered a misnomer. He called this short-statured group Barrineans, after Lake Barrine.

Birdsell classified Aboriginal Australians into three major groups, mixed together to varying degrees: the Carpentarians, best represented in Arnhem Land; the Murrayans, centred in southeastern Australia; and the Barrineans. He argued that people related to Oceanic Negritos were the first arrivals, and had been absorbed or replaced over time by later incoming peoples; the present-day Barrineans retained the greatest proportion of ancestry from this original Negrito group, "[b]ut this is not to say that the Barrineans are Negritos ... the Negritic component is clearly subordinate, and ... the preponderant element is Murrayian." This trihybrid model is generally considered defunct today; craniometric, genetic, and linguistic evidence does not support a separate origin of Barrinean or other Aboriginal groups, and physical differences between Aboriginal groups can be explained by adaptation to differing environments.

In 2002, the purported existence of short-statured people in Queensland was brought into the public eye by Keith Windschuttle and Tim Gillin in an article published by the right-wing Quadrant magazine (edited by Windschuttle himself). The authors argued that these people were evidence for a distinct Negrito population in support of Birdsell's theory, and claimed that "the fact that the Australian pygmies have been so thoroughly expunged from public memory suggests an indecent concurrence between scholarly and political interests", because evidence of descent from earlier or later waves of origin could lead to conflicting claims of priority by Aboriginal people and hence pose a threat to political co-operation among them. This and other publications promoting the trihybrid model drew several responses, which went over the current scientific evidence against the theory, and suggested that attempts to revive the theory were motivated by an agenda of undermining Aboriginal and Torres Strait Islander claims to native title.

Some Aboriginal oral histories and oral traditions from Queensland tell of "little red men". In 1957 the last remaining survivor of the Jinibara (the Dalla people) tribe of SE Queensland, Gaiarbau, who was born in 1873 and had lived for many years traditionally with his tribe, said that he knew of the "existence of these “little people – the Dinderi", also known as "Dimbilum", "Danagalalangur" and "Kandju". Gaiarbau claims he saw members of a "tribe of small people ... and said they were like dwarfs ... and ... not ... any of them stood five feet [1.5m]." The Dinderi are also recorded in other stories, such as one concerning a platypus myth and another, The Dinderi and Gujum - The Legend of the Stones of the Mary River.

Susan McIntyre-Tamwoy, archaeologist and Adjunct Professor at James Cook University, has written of the northern Cape York Aboriginal people's belief of the bipotaim, which is when “the landscape as we know it today was created”. Bipotaim was formed “before people, although not perhaps before the short people or the red devils as these were also here before people”. She writes, “many ethnographers recorded stories of ‘short people’ or what they referred to as ‘pygmy tribes’", such as Lindsey Page Winterbotham. She used information collected both through oral accounts (including those of Injinoo people), observation and archival research. McIntyre-Tamwoy recounts a bipotaim story: "We are the short people [pygmies?]. Red devils occupy parts of the adjacent stony coast but our home is here in the sand dunes and forest. Before the Marakai ['white people'] came to our land the people were plentiful and they roamed the land. They understood the land and called out in the language of the country to seek permission, as they should ...".

According to Nathan Sentance, a librarian from the indigenous Wiradjuri nation employed by the Australian National Museum, there is no known archaeological or biological evidence such a people existed. Sentance claims it is a myth used to justify the colonisation of Australia as well as other countries by Europeans.

Micronesia and Melanesia 
Norman Gabel mentions that rumours exist of pygmy people in the interior mountains of Viti Levu in Fiji, but explains he had no evidence of their existence.
E. W. Gifford reiterates Gabel's statement and claims that tribes of pygmies in the closest proximity to Fiji would most likely be found in Vanuatu.

In 2008, the remains of at least 25 miniature humans, who lived between 1,000 and 3,000 years ago, were found on the islands of Palau in Micronesia.

During the 1900s, when Vanuatu was known as New Hebrides, sizable pygmy tribes were first reported throughout northeastern Santo. It is likely that they are not limited to this region of New Hebrides. Nonetheless, there is no anthropological evidence linking pygmies to other islands of Vanuatu.

Archaic humans 
The extinct archaic human species Homo luzonensis has been classified as a pygmy group. The remains used to identify Homo luzonensis were discovered in Luzon, the Philippines in 2007, and were designated as a species in 2019. Homo floresiensis, another archaic human from the island of Flores in Indonesia, stood around 1.1 m (3 ft 7 in) tall. The pygmy phenotype evolved as a result of island syndrome which, amongst other things, results in reduced body size in insular humans.

See also 
 Koro-pok-guru, small people in Ainu folklore
 Ota Benga, man taken as slave and zoo exhibit to the U.S.
 Vazimba, possible first inhabitants of Madagascar
 Homo floriensis, an extinct species of short humans
 Island syndrome, the set of conditions which develop in island-dwelling organisms, including the pygmy phenotype in human people
 Dwarfs and pygmies in ancient Egypt

References

External links 

 African Pygmies: Hunter-Gatherer Peoples of Central Africa
 The Pygmies' Plight, Smithsonian Magazine, December 2008 by Paul Raffaele
 Survival International: Pygmies
 Pygmy Survival Alliance
 Undated footage of Pygmy tribe constructing a vine bridge
 Mbuti Net Hunters of the Ituri Forest, story with photos and link to Audio Slideshow, by Todd Pitman, The Associated Press, 2010.

Pygmyism
Pygmyism
Hunter-gatherers of Oceania
Hunter-gatherers of Asia
Ethnonyms